Sania Mirza and Bruno Soares were the defending champions but lost in the first round to Andrea Hlaváčková and Łukasz Kubot.

Martina Hingis and Leander Paes won the title, defeating Bethanie Mattek-Sands and Sam Querrey in the final, 6–4, 3–6, [10–7]. Hingis and Paes became the first team in more than 40 years to win three of the four mixed doubles titles in one year.

Seeds

Draw

Finals

Top half

Bottom half

References

External links
 Draw
2015 US Open – Doubles draws and results at the International Tennis Federation

Mixed Doubles
US Open - Mixed Doubles
US Open - Mixed Doubles
US Open (tennis) by year – Mixed doubles